This page lists all the tours and matches played by Pakistan national field hockey team from 2000 to 2004. During this period Pakistan's most successful competition were the Hockey Champions Trophy (Third place: 2002,2003,2004). Pakistan won the 2000 Sultan Azlan Shah Cup becoming the first team to defend the title. Pakistan finished fourth at the 2002 Asian Games, first time the team failed to win a medal at the event.

List of tours

Results

2000

2000 Sultan Azlan Shah Cup

2000 Olympic Qualifiers

2000 Series – Australia

2000 Series – New Zealand

2000 Summer Olympics

2001

Prime Ministers Gold Cup

2001 Series – Spain

International match – Germany

2001 Panasonic Masters

International match – Belgium

2001 Series – Netherlands

2001 Sultan Azlan Shah Cup

2001 Hockey Champions Trophy

2002

International match – Malaysia

Six Nations Tournament

2002 Hockey World Cup

2002 Series – Spain

2002 Commonwealth Games

2002 Hockey Champions Trophy

2002 Asian Games

2003

2003 Series – Malaysia

2003 Sultan Azlan Shah Cup

Tri Nation Tournament

2003 Series – China

2003 Unofficial match – Netherlands

2003 International match – Netherlands

2003 Hockey Champions Trophy

2003 Hockey Asia Cup

2003 Afro–Asian Games

2003 Series – Malaysia

2004

2004 Sultan Azlan Shah Cup

2004 Olympic Qualifiers

Tri Nations Tournament

2004 Series – Germany

2004 Hamburg Masters

2004 Hockey RaboTrophy

Tri Nations Tournament

2004 Summer Olympics

2004 Series – India

2004 Hockey Champions Trophy 

Field hockey in Pakistan